Iyael Lyases Tafari Constable (born 14 March 1978, Hackney, London, England), better known as Glamma Kid, is a toaster and former Royal Air Force trainee of part-Jamaican descent. He had two top 10 hits in 1999.

Music career
During the 1990s, Glamma Kid was featured on productions by UK producers Mafia & Fluxy. Glamma Kid has performed live with Grace Jones on her hit single "My Jamaican Guy" on UK television for BBC Windrush. In 1997, Glamma Kid appeared on BBC Radio 1 rap show with Tim Westwood. In 1998, he was awarded the Best Reggae Act at the MOBO Awards.

He has had two UK top 10 hits, "Taboo" and "Why". He also teamed up with UK dance duo Basement Jaxx on the song "Fly Life". His song called "Ladies Knight" was a collaboration with UK reggae singer Maxi Priest and interpolates Kool and the Gang's "Ladies Night".

Glamma Kid collaborated on a song with Beenie Man and Jamelia titled "Bling Bling Bling".

Estelle featured on Glamma Kid's "Computer Love".

Discography

Albums
 Kidology (2000) - UK #66

Singles

References

External links
 

1978 births
English people of Jamaican descent
21st-century Black British male singers
British reggae musicians
20th-century Black British male singers
British dancehall musicians
Ragga musicians
Living people
People from the London Borough of Hackney